Legal Hustle is the debut compilation album by American rapper Cormega. It was released on May 25, 2004, through Koch Records. It was supported by two singles: "Let It Go", which features M.O.P. and "Dangerous", which features Unda P. and Vybz Kartel.

The album features guest appearances from various Cormega labelmates as well as more popular rappers such as Ghostface Killah, Large Professor, AZ, Kurupt, Jayo Felony, The Jacka and others.

Track listing

Sample credits
Sample credits adapted from WhoSampled.
"Intro"
"We the People Who Are Darker Than Blue" by Curtis Mayfield
"Hold Me, Thrill Me, Kiss Me, Kill Me" by U2
"Hoody"
"UFO" by ESG
"Let It Go"
"Time" by Manfred Mann Chapter Three
"Sugar Ray and Hearns"
"Do What He Wants" by Tessie Hill
"Tony/Montana"
"Ships Ahoy!" by The O'Jays
"Beautiful Mind"
"Ike's Mood I" by Isaac Hayes
"Dangerous"
"Tempo" by Anthony Red Rose
"Dangerous" by Conroy Smith
"Deep Blue Sea"
"Ain't No Love (Left in My Heart for You)" by High Inergy
"More Crime"
"Winter Time'" by Steve Miller Band
"Bring It Back"
"You've Lost That Lovin' Feelin'" by Isaac Hayes
"Personified"
"I Wanna Write You a Long Song" by David Oliver
"Stay Up"
"Love T.K.O." by Teddy Pendergrass
"The Machine"
"Tu Y Yo" by Emmanuel

Charts

References 

Cormega albums
Albums produced by Ayatollah
Albums produced by Emile Haynie
2004 compilation albums